Darian Townes (born July 31, 1984) is an American professional basketball player who plays for Sporting Al Riyadi Beirut of the Lebanese Basketball League. He played college basketball for the University of Arkansas.

Professional career
After going undrafted in the 2008 NBA Draft, Townes signed with the Polish basketball team, PGE Turów Zgorzelec. In his first game with Turow Zgorzelec, he scored 5 points and 2 rebounds in a 82-65 win over the Legia Warsaw.

On January 24, 2020, Townes signed with the Lebanese team, Sporting Al Riyadi Beirut for the 2020 season.

References

External links
Darian Townes Player Profile at eurobasket.com
Darian Townes Player Profile for Polish Basketball League

1984 births
Living people
African-American basketball players
American men's basketball players
American expatriate basketball people in Lebanon
American expatriate basketball people in Poland
American expatriate basketball people in South Korea
American expatriate basketball people in Taiwan
American expatriate basketball people in Turkey
Basketball players from Virginia
People from Alexandria, Virginia
Power forwards (basketball)
Al Riyadi Club Beirut basketball players
21st-century African-American sportspeople
20th-century African-American people
Fubon Braves players
Pauian Archiland basketball players
Super Basketball League imports